Heinrich Wilhelm Petersen, known as Heinrich Petersen-Angeln (4 April 1850 in Westerholz – 23 April 1906 in Angeln, Düsseldorf) was a German painter. He was a pupil of Eugen Dücker.

References

1850 births
1906 deaths
19th-century German painters
19th-century German male artists
German male painters
20th-century German painters
20th-century German male artists